The 2011 Swedish Golf Tour, titled as the 2011 Nordea Tour for sponsorship reasons, was the 28th season of the Swedish Golf Tour.

All tournaments also featured on the 2011 Nordic Golf League.

Schedule
The following table lists official events during the 2011 season.

Order of Merit
The Order of Merit was titled as the Nordea Tour Ranking and was based on prize money won during the season, calculated using a points-based system.

See also
2011 Danish Golf Tour
2011 Finnish Tour
2011 Swedish Golf Tour (women)

Notes

References

Swedish Golf Tour
Swedish Golf Tour